Jan Konrad Liberda (26 November 1936 – 6 February 2020) was a Polish football forward. Liberda played mostly for one team, Polonia Bytom, where he remained since 1950, until 1969. He ended his career in 1971 at AZ. He twice was the topscorer of the Ekstraklasa, in 1959 with 21 goals, and in 1962 with 16 goals. Also, in 1962, he won championship of Poland. All together, Liberda played in 304 of Polonia's games, scoring 146 goals.

Liberda 35 times capped for Poland, scoring 8 goals. He debuted on 20 May 1959 in Hamburg, in a 1–1 tie with Western Germany.

He later managed TuS Schloß Neuhaus.

He died in February 2020 at the age of 83.

References

External links
 Jan Liberda's biography at Polonia Bytom's webpage

1936 births
2020 deaths
Association football forwards
AZ Alkmaar players
Ekstraklasa players
Poland international footballers
Polish football managers
Polish footballers
Polonia Bytom managers
Polonia Bytom players
Sportspeople from Bytom
SC Paderborn 07 managers